An election was held on November 8, 2016 to elect 16 of the 33 members of Wisconsin's State Senate. The election coincided with elections for other offices, including U.S. President, U.S. Senate, U.S. House of Representatives and State Assembly. The primary election was held on August 9, 2016.

Republicans consolidated their control of the Senate by gaining one seat, winning 9 seats compared to 7 seats for the Democrats.

Results

Statewide
Statewide results of the 2016 Wisconsin State Senate election:

District
Results of the 2016 Wisconsin State Senate election by district:

References

Wisconsin State Senate
State Senate
2016